Augustus Short (11 June 1802 – 5 October 1883) was the first Anglican bishop of Adelaide, South Australia.

Early life and career 
Born at Bickham House, near Exeter, Devon, England, the third son of Charles Short, a London barrister, offspring of an old English county family, and his wife Grace, daughter of Humphrey Millett.  Short was educated at Westminster School and Christ Church, Oxford, where he received first-class honours in classics and graduated with a Master of Arts in 1826 and D. D. 1847.

Short took orders in the Church of England as deacon in 1826 and priest in 1827 and in the same year accepted the curacy of Culham, near Abingdon, Oxfordshire. In 1829 he resigned to become a tutor and lecturer in his old college; one of his students was William Ewart Gladstone. In March 1833 he was appointed public examiner in the classical schools, and in January 1834 was made junior censor. In June 1835 he was presented as vicar by the dean and chapter of Christ Church to the living of Ravensthorpe, Northamptonshire. The church and parsonage were both badly in need of repairs and restoration, the church was badly attended, and the education of the children neglected. Short, by assiduous visiting and hard work, succeeded in making considerable improvements in all these directions. In December 1835 he married Millecent (or Millicent) Phillips, second daughter of John Phillips of Culham House, Oxfordshire, who survived him with several daughters and a son, Henry Augustus Short. Henry Augustus married Ethel Catherine Edgerton-Warburton (the eldest daughter of Colonel Peter Egerton Warburton) on 28 October 1871.

Short published in 1838, Sermons intended principally to illustrate the Remedial Character of the Christian Scheme, was appointed Bampton lecturer in April 1845, and preached the course at Oxford in 1846. The lectures were published in the same year under the title The Witness of the Spirit with our Spirit.

Career as a bishop 

In 1845 the archbishop of Canterbury offered Short the choice of two newly established sees, Newcastle, New South Wales, and Adelaide, South Australia. Short decided to accept Adelaide and on 29 June (St Peter's Day), 1847, was consecrated at Westminster Abbey. Short sailed in the Derwent for Adelaide on 1 September and arrived on 28 December 1847, the eleventh anniversary of the proclamation of the colony. There were then only five churches in the diocese, three at Adelaide, one at Blakiston and another at Gawler. Short travelled through the settled parts of South Australia, and before the end of 1848 went to Western Australia, then a part of his diocese, where he consecrated that state's first church, St John's Anglican Church, Albany. He was the first president of its council of governors. He consecrated Christ Church, North Adelaide in December 1849.

Funding 

In August 1851 the withdrawal of state aid to religion compelled the Church of England in South Australia to devise a voluntary system of maintaining itself. Short, who had prepared a draft constitution for the diocese, visited England in 1853, sailing from Port Adelaide aboard the Shackamaxon with his wife and children. There he obtained counsels' opinion, which agreed that it was competent for a colonial diocese to organise itself without Imperial authority. The constitution was submitted in October 1855 to a diocesan assembly and was adopted. In 1856 the diocese of Perth, Western Australia was founded and Short was relieved of the oversight of the whole of Western Australia, a difficult task especially in view of the limited means of communication.

The Adelaide diocese had been presented with some land in the city by W. Leigh, the income from which became very useful for general diocesan purposes, and by the liberality of William Allen the pastoral aid fund was instituted. Other funds for the endowment of the diocese and for providing retiring allowances for the clergy were also successfully initiated.

Charitable works
In 1856 he instigated, with the support of Adelaide churches of all denominations, the South Australian Female Refuge for practical support and protection of homeless girls and women, and was its first vice-president. The facility, previously known as "Norwood House", at the corner of Sydenham Road and William Street, Norwood, opened in 1857, and in later years was known more simply as the South Australian Refuge.

Adelaide cathedral 

Soon after Short's acceptance of the see, he made enquiries about a site for a cathedral and was informed that the centre of Victoria Square had been allotted for this purpose by Governor Frederick Robe. This was objected to by the city council and Short decided to have the question finally settled and brought a friendly lawsuit for this purpose. The decision went against Short and eventually the present site in North Adelaide was bought. Subscriptions were raised but the building was not begun until 1869. It was consecrated as St Peter's Cathedral on 1 January 1878.

Late career and death 

Short was a fine scholar and a thoughtful preacher, always endeavouring to convince by argument rather than by the use of rhetoric. He was interested in education and was elected vice-chancellor of University of Adelaide when it was founded in 1874, and chancellor in 1876.

In November 1881 Short became ill while preaching and under medical advice decided to retire. He left Adelaide for London on 6 January 1882. On 30 November he attended the consecration of George Wyndham Kennion as second bishop of Adelaide, and handed him the pastoral staff which had been presented to Short by the clergy and laity of Adelaide on the twenty-fifth anniversary of his consecration. Short died at Eastbourne (or London) on 5 October 1883, his estate was valued for probate at £8200.

Short was regarded as kind and modest, a good business man and an excellent administrator who could deal with church matters with firmness, wisdom and discretion. A good man and a good colonist, with a great capacity for work, he had all the qualities of a great pioneer bishop.

Short Street in Fremantle is named after him.

Bibliography
Fred T. Whitington Augustus Short, first bishop of Adelaide : a chapter of colonial church history E.S. Wigg & Son, Adelaide, 1887.

See also
 Beaumont House, Short's now-historical residence
 North Road Cemetery, an historic cemetery established by Short in 1853 on land he once owned

References

Further reading

Augustus Short: Pioneer bishop (Many articles on Trove)

1802 births
1883 deaths
19th-century Anglican bishops in Australia
19th-century English Anglican priests
Alumni of Christ Church, Oxford
Anglican bishops of Adelaide
People educated at Westminster School, London
Clergy from Exeter
Settlers of South Australia
Chancellors of the University of Adelaide
Vice-Chancellors of the University of Adelaide